Riverbend is a suburb of Johannesburg, South Africa. It is located in Region B of the City of Johannesburg Metropolitan Municipality.

It consists of a few small agricultural holdings, as well as one area of densely populated alone standing housing.

References

Johannesburg Region B